Giovanni Battista Cecchi (1748/9 – after 1815) was an Italian engraver, active in a neoclassical style in his native Florence, Region of Tuscany, Italy.

Biography 
Initially trained as a carpenter, an injury to his dominant right hand prompted apprenticing under Francesco Conti, and subsequently became a follower of the engraver Ferdinando Gregori. He initially dedicated himself to printed copies of major paintings, for example, a reproduction (1767) of the Madonna and Child by Annibale Carracci (On display at Istituto nazionale per la grafica) and a copy (1768) of the Mystical Marriage of St Catherine by Francesco Vanni.

He was one of the artists commissioned by the Grand-Duke Leopold in 1769 to complete a 12 volume work: Serie degli uomini i più illustri nella pittura, scultura, e architettura con i loro elogi, e ritratti incisi in rame cominciando dalla sua prima restaurazione fino ai tempi presenti, containing over 300 engravings of artist portraits.

Among his portraits were depictions of the violinist Pietro Nardini, sculptor Vellano da Padova, painter Battista Franco, and reproductions of Habsburg-Lorraine family portraits painted by Giuseppe Piattoli in 1785 and 1791. He collaborated with the engraver Benedetto Eredi in a two volume set of Bonarum artium splendori XII tabulae a praestantissimis Italiae pictoribus expressae 1776–1779. He engraved the sculptural collections of Gaetano Vascellini. Cecchi engraved a calendar with designs by Giuseppe Zocchi. He created engravings for the first two volumes of L'Etruria pittrice ovvero Storia della pittura toscana dedotta dai suoi monumenti che si esibiscono in stampa dal secolo X fino al presente by Marco Lastri.

In 1800, he created engravings recalling the resistance against Napoleonic invasions: Insurrection of Arezzo against the French, the Battle of the Piazza del Duomo of Arezzo, The loyalty of the Aretini and Cortona freed from the yoke of the French.

Other works
Calling of St Andrew to Apostleship after Ludovico Cardi
Martyrdom of St Laurence after Pietro da Cortona
Martyrdom of St Vitalis after Federico Barrocci
Stoning of St Stephen after Federico Barrocci
Entombment of Christ after Daniele da Volterra
Cataline's Conspiracy after Salvator Rosa

Note

Bibliography 
  Ad vocem
  Luigi Servolini, Dizionario illustrato degli incisori italiani moderni e contemporanei, 1955, p. 185, Gorlich, editor, Milan.
  Catalog of Exhibit at  Biblioteca Nazionale Centrale di Roma.
Translated from the Italian Wikipedia entry

1748 births
Italian neoclassical painters
Artists from Florence
Italian engravers